= Art Radio =

- Belgrade; Serbia
- Frequency: 88.0 MHz

Programming
- Format: Oldies

History
- First air date: 2002
- Last air date: December 2008

Art Radio 88 MHz was a Belgrade "oldies" radio station founded in 2002.

Art Radio claimed the most complete CD and LP library of world oldies standards, including some valuable rare archive records from original sound carriers.

Newer music such as 1980s and 1990s pop and rock hits were played daily, as well as the newest songs from the world's greatest stars. During the day, there were announcements of cultural happenings in Belgrade including theaters, galleries, cinemas and concerts, for which the station was often a sponsor.

In August 2008, the Republic Telecommunication Agency (RATEL) confirmed that there were 33 radio stations illegally broadcasting, and Art Radio was one of them. In December 2008, Radio Art closed down.
